Luftinjë is a village and a former municipality in the Gjirokastër County, southern Albania. At the 2015 local government reform it became a subdivision of the municipality Memaliaj. The population at the 2011 census was 1,734. The municipal unit consists of the villages Izvor, Luftinjë, Luftinjë e Sipërme, Rrapaj, Rabie, Gllavë e Vogël, Maricaj, Arrëz e Madhe, Vagalat, Tosk Martalloz, Dervishaj, Zhapokikë, Zhapokikë e Sipërme, Ballaj and Luadhaj.

References 

Former municipalities in Gjirokastër County
Administrative units of Memaliaj
Villages in Gjirokastër County